DeJuan Michael Newton (born November 11, 1987) is an American football safety who is currently a free agent. He was signed by the Indianapolis Colts as an undrafted free agent in 2010. He played college football at Buffalo.

Professional career

Indianapolis Colts
Newton was originally signed by the Indianapolis Colts as an undrafted free agent on April 30, 2010. He was waived on September 4, 2010, and signed to the Colts' practice squad on September 5. He was promoted to the Colts' active roster on October 5. He was waived/injured on August 28, 2011. He was released with an injury settlement on September 1. On February 9, 2012, Newton resigned with the Colts.

References

External links
Indianapolis Colts bio

Living people
1987 births
Players of American football from Maryland
American football safeties
Buffalo Bulls football players
Indianapolis Colts players
People from Pasadena, Maryland
Calvert Hall College High School alumni